Necturus krausei is an extinct species of mudpuppy salamanders from the Paleocene of Saskatchewan in Canada. It is known from a set of vertebrae found in the Ravenscrag Formation.

References 

Proteidae
Prehistoric salamanders
Paleogene amphibians of North America
Paleogene Canada
Fossils of Canada
Paleontology in Saskatchewan
Fossil taxa described in 1978